The playoff round of the 2017 IIHF World Championship was held from 18 to 21 May 2017. The top four of each preliminary group qualified for the playoff round.

Format
The teams played crossover in the quarterfinals, with Germany in Cologne and France in Paris, if qualified.

Qualified teams

Bracket

All times are local (UTC+2).

Quarterfinals

Semifinals

Bronze medal game

Gold medal game

References

External links
Official website

P